Mohammadabad (also Romanized as Moḩammadābād and Muhammadābād, also known as Moḩammadābād-e Āqā’ī and Moḩammadābād-e Shīb Āb) is a city in the Central District of Hamun County, Sistan and Baluchestan province, Iran. Its population was 2,435 in 2010, up from 2,175 at the 2006 census.

References 

Populated places in Hamun County

Cities in Sistan and Baluchestan Province